Novorondonia ropicoides is a species of beetle in the family Cerambycidae, and the only species in the genus Novorondonia. It was described by Breuning in 1962.

References

Apomecynini
Beetles described in 1962
Cerambycidae genera
Monotypic beetle genera